Epelysidris brocha is the only species of ant in the genus Epelysidris. Described by Barry Bolton in 1987 in Borneo, the species is only known from soil in tropical and moss rainforests, based on two known specimen collections.

References

External links

Myrmicinae
Monotypic ant genera
Insects of Borneo
Insects of Indonesia
Insects described in 1987